Umaidpur is one of the villages of Morwa Dakshni Gram panchayat in Morwa (Vidhan Sabha constituency) in the Samastipur District of Bihar State, India.

History 
The current history can be traced back to the end of the 16th century when the area was a part of Singh Dynasty and was ruled by Vikramjeet Singh of Sarmera. During the Mughal period of 1571-1611, It was a huge empire and was ruled by Vikramjeet Singh of Sarmera. Then after his death the empire was in 1614 the empire was destroyed due to civil war and heavy rainfall. Then in 1720 the descendants of Vikramjeet Singh of Sarmera established Sarmera Estate.

In 1770, the East India Company defeated Sarmera Estate and occupied the village. Then the ruler of Sarmera Estate, Bhim Lal Singh of Sarmera broke his estate into many small parts. Then this area became a part of the Presidency during the British Raj in 1778.

In the early 19th century, Umaidpur became a part of the newly created province of Bihar. The regional office was Harsingpur. Kothi and T.I. Pal was the officer representative on behalf of the British. Throughout British rule, all the villages were part of the estates run by independent Zamindars, calling themselves a Raja, or directly ruled by the British Raj. The arid lands of Umaidpur was part of the Narhan Estate and the Jaintpur Estate, Muzaffarpur. The British cultivated indigo, sugarcane, poppy, and tobacco. Land revenue was collected with the help of Jeth Rayaits for the Tehsildar (revenue collector). Sukkan Roy was the Jeth Rayait for Narhan Estate, whereas Ram Pratap Roy was the Jeth Rayait for the Jaintpur Estate. Chullahai Hazari was the Brahil, whose responsibility was to inform villagers to come at the Jeth Rayait's house to pay land revenues.

When the British left India, they sold all their land possessions to Janak Kishore Prasad, including Harsinghpur Kothi. Presently, Umaidpur is the home of a former Mukhiya (1994-1996; 2001-2005), Sukhdeo Roy, the son of Sukkan Roy.

Demographics 
The total land of the Umaidpur village is around 300 bighas. In Samastipur district and Patna, one bigha is equivalent to 20 Kattha (1361 ft2 or 126.44 m2); one Kattha is sub-divided in 20 Dhur and one Dhur is approximately 68.06 ft2 (6.321 m2).  According to the 2011 Census of India, Umaidpur village (vilcode-236729) had around 329 households. The total population of the village is around 1,960 (male 1034 and female 926).

Geography and climate 

Time zone: IST (UTC+5:30)
Elevation / Altitude: 51 meters above sea level.

Location
Umaidpur is located at 25.776563, 85.681752. This village is located in the far south-west of Samastipur District, bordered to the north and east by Naua Chak village, to the south by Jitwarpur Kumhara and in the west by Morwa.  The post office is at Bhagwatpur. The PIN code is 848135 and the telephone STD code is 06274. The nearest banks are State Bank of India in Tajpur Morwa (006562) and Central Bank of India in Sarairanjan (280058).

Climate
Umaidpur experiences six distinct seasons: ऋतु (Ritu (Indian season)): Spring वसन्त, Winter शिशिर, Summer ग्रीष्म, Monsoon वर्षा, Autumn शरद्,  and Fall हेमन्त. Typical summer months are from May to July, with maximum temperatures ranging from 35 °C to 45 °C. May and June are the warmest months in Umaidpur; although summer doesn't end until July. The monsoon lasts from August to September, with moderate/high rainfall and temperatures ranging from 15 °C to 35 °C. Winter begins in mid-January; the daytime temperature hovers around 28 °C (82 °F) while night temperature is below 15 °C for most of January and February.

Summer (Grisham - ग्रीष्म)         May–July (वैशाख से आषाढ)
Monsoon (rainy -वर्षा)             Mid-July–September (श्रावन से भाद्रपद)
Autumn (शरद्)                    October–November (आश्विन से कार्तिक)
Fall (हेमन्त)                     December–mid January (मार्गशीर्ष से पौष)
Winter (शिशिर)                   Mid-January–mid March (पौष से फाल्गुन)
Spring (वसन्त)                  March–April (फाल्गुन से चैत्र)

Transportation 
Umaidpur is well connected by buses and rails to different towns/cities of India.

Roads
Umaidpur is connected to various parts of India through national and state highways. The nearest major highways are:

State Highways 49 (SH 49) connects it to Hajipur through Tajpur city. SH 49 starts from Hajipur and is connected further with Mahua, Vaishali and Hajipur through state highway. 
National Highway 28 connects it through Mushrigharari or Tajpur to Muzaffarpur, Motihari and Barauni.
National Highway 103 connects it through Sarairanjan to Mushrigharari/Samastipur and Jandaha/Hajipur/Patna.

Bus services are available from Samastipur to Hajipur, Patna (80 km), Muzaffarpur (56  km), Chhapra (150 km), Siwan (203 km), Motihari (156 km), Bettiah, Ranchi and other cities.

Railways
The Nearest Railway Stations are: Samastipur Junction railway station and Shahpur Patori Railway Station. One can travel from Umaidpur by bus, car or bicycle to Samastipur Junction railway station, Shahpur Patori Junction railway station or Muzaffarpur Junction railway station to board train for New Delhi, Howrah, Mumbai, Patna, Lucknow, Ranchi and other parts of India.

Air
The nearest airport, Lok Nayak Jayaprakash Narayan International Airport, Patna Airport, is 88.8 km (travel time is about 2hrs and 1 min) from Umaidpur. From Umaidpur to Patna or vice versa, you can travel by buses, taxis or train.

Education 
Umaidpur village has a Primary and Upper Primary levels School. It is one of the old schools in this area. It is a co-educational school up to 8th class.

School Name: P.S. Umaidpur.
Sub-district/district/state: Morwa/Samastipur/Bihar
School address: Umaidpur, Morwa, Samastipur, Bihar - 848135
Public/private: Public 
Year of establishment : 1965
Medium: Hindi 

The overall literacy rate seems to be around 46.94%. Based on India Census 2011, the female literacy rate is 42.76%, whereas the male literacy rate is 51.0%. There are few people from this village who have gone to IIT Kanpur, Jawaharlal Nehru University, New Delhi and abroad for higher education. There are also few peoples of this village, who live abroad like in United States, UAE and Canada.

Agriculture
From Imperial Gazetteer of India, Volume 11, it appears that sugar-cane, indigo and poppy were grown in the land of this and adjacent villages during and before British rule. Between 1800 and early nineteenth century, the cultivation of indigo plants (Indigofera tinctoria, also known as I. sumatrana) and poppy (a flowering plant in the subfamily Papaveroideae of the family Papaveraceae) was more prevalent. Indigo dye made in India was exported by British to the Greeks and the Romans, where it was valued as a luxury product. Maharaja of Darbhanga abandoned the cultivation of indigo around 1901, because the fall in the price of indigo dye, due to the competition of artificial substitutes, has caused many other factories to abandon. The chief feature of the indigo industry in Umaidpur regions, as compared with the other indigo-growing tracts in North Bihar, was the large area cultivated direct by the factories themselves in the Samastipur subdivision. The plant, when cut, was fermented in masonry vats and oxidized either by beating or by currents of steam. The dye thus precipitated was boiled and dried into cakes. Due to the fall in the value of indigo dye, the factories have taken to the growing of ordinary crops. The principal exports were rice, indigo, gram, pulses, linseed, mustard seed, saltpetre, tobacco, hides, and ghee; and the principal imports were rice and other food-grains, salt, kerosene oil, gunny-bags, coal and coke, European cotton piece-goods, and raw cotton. Gram, pulses, and oilseeds are chiefly sent to Calcutta, and rice and other food-grains to Saran and Muzaffarpur. The imports of food-grains came for the most part from Bhagalpur and Nepal, coal and coke from Burdwary kerosene oil from the Twenty-four Parganas, and salt and piece-goods from Calcutta.

Most fertile part of the village, use to produce all the most valuable rabi and bhadoi crops. In the low-lying areas, the main crop grown is winter rice, though in some parts good rabi crops are also raised on the lands. Rabi and Bhadoi crops were grown from 1800 until recently (1980). Villages like Umaidpur were chiefly dependent on the Aghani (or winter) rabi and bhadoi harvests. The village land falls into two classes: Bhith (uplands) and Dhanhar (low lands where water logging occurred during rainy season). Bhith was further classified as saliferous land or usher (soils in which salinity is mainly due to accumulation of alkali salts are called alkali soils) was found in patches in the outer area between good land and low-lying land. Nunia caste from the neighbouring village, Nauachak, used to extract saltpetere in the summer after rabi crop from these lands for their living. In these lands small farmers grew mainly 'Marua, also called mandua, nachini or Ragi' or Finger Millets (Eleusine coracana), Kauni (foxtail milet) and Sama (kutaki or little milet). Food-crops grown also included potatoes, and suthni (Dioscorea fasciculate). The chief non-food crops are oilseeds. Tobacco and chilies are cultivated as commercial crops. Of the other non-food crops, kharhaul or thatching-grass was the most valuable, but now these lands are used for growing paddy.

Governance 
Umaidpur became a part of Samastipur district, when Darbhanga district was split into three districts in 1972. Before British, the mention of this district in the Imperial Gazetteer of India (volume 11) goes back to A. D. 1400. When this area was taken over by the British in 1765, it was included in Silbah Bihar and formed with the greater part of Muzaffarpur District, the Sarkar of Tirhut. Bihar was retained as an independent revenue division, and in 1782 Tirhut (including Hajipur) was made into a Collectorate. In 1875 Tirhut was divided into the two existing Districts of Muzaffarpur and Darbhanga. 
The governance of the Umiadpur village is run through community development block program administered by a Morwa Block Development Officer, Morwa Dakshin Panchayat headed by Mukhiya, and a local administrative unit at the village level. The law enforcement is provided by Tajpur Police Station. The village is under the civial jurisdiction of Samastipur district.
Umaidpur village is a part of Morwa (Vidhan Sabha constituency)  and the current member of this constituency of Bihar Legislative Assembly is Vidya Sagar Singh Nishad of JD(U).
Lok Sabha Constituency of Umaidpur village is No. 22 Ujiarpur (Lok Sabha constituency). The Lok Sabha member is Nityanand Rai, Bharatiya Janta Party.

References

External links
History of Bihar
Samastipur District official website
Dsal.uchicago.edu

Villages in Samastipur district